Dish, dishes or DISH may refer to:

Culinary
 Dish (food), something prepared to be eaten
 Dishware, plates and bowls for eating, cutting boards, silverware

Communications
 Dish antenna a type of antenna
 Dish Network, a satellite television provider in North America
 Dish TV, a satellite television provider in India
 Satellite dish, an antenna for receiving satellite signals
 Stanford Dish, a U.S. Government-owned radio-telescope at Stanford University

Arts, entertainment, and media
 The Dish (TV series), an American television show
 The Dish, an Australian film
 DISH (band), a Japanese band
 Dish (American band), an American alternative rock band
 "Dish", a 2016 single by Chancellor

Other uses
 Dish, Texas, a town in Denton County, Texas, United States
 Diffuse idiopathic skeletal hyperostosis, a form of arthritis
 Dish of a bicycle wheel

See also

 Disch, surname
 Dyche, surname
 Diš (cuneiform), a sign in cuneiform writing

 Dishdish, a village in Iran
 Dishy (disambiguation)